What Is the Matter with Willi? is a 1970 German comedy film directed by Werner Jacobs and starring Heinz Erhardt, Ralf Wolter and Ruth Stephan. A tax inspector tries to reform the Ministry of Finance. It was based on a character Heinz Erhardt played on television. It was followed by a loose sequel That Can't Shake Our Willi! and in 1971 a third film Our Willi Is the Best was made with Erhard returning as Willi. The final film Willi Manages The Whole Thing was released in 1972.

Cast

References

External links

1970 films
1970 comedy films
German comedy films
West German films
1970s German-language films
Films directed by Werner Jacobs
Constantin Film films
1970s German films